The Division of Newcastle is an Australian electoral division in the state of New South Wales.

Geography
Since 1984, federal electoral division boundaries in Australia have been determined at redistributions by a redistribution committee appointed by the Australian Electoral Commission. Redistributions occur for the boundaries of divisions in a particular state, and they occur every seven years, or sooner if a state's representation entitlement changes or when divisions of a state are malapportioned.

History

The division was proclaimed in 1900, and was one of the original 65 divisions to be contested at the first federal election. The division was named after the city of Newcastle, around which the division is centred.

It has been held by the Australian Labor Party for its entire existence. Historically, it has been one of that party's safest non-metropolitan seats; the Hunter Region is one of the few country regions where Labor consistently does well. Labor has never tallied less than 58 percent of the Two-party-preferred vote in a general election, and has only come close to losing it once, when it tallied 53 percent in a 1935 by-election. It is the only original division to be held by just one party since the first federal election.

The Division of Newcastle has had just six members since 1901, the fewest of any of the original divisions.  From 1901 to 1958, the seat was held by the Watkins family. The seat's first member, David Watkins, held the seat until his death in 1935. The ensuing by-election was won by his son, David Oliver. Allan Morris' brother Peter Morris was also a Member of the House, holding the Division of Shortland, which lies immediately to the south. Charles Jones' brother Sam was the member for Waratah in the New South Wales Legislative Assembly for much of the time that he was the member. The electoral district of Waratah lay within the boundaries of the Division of Newcastle.

The seat's most prominent members were David Watkins, the second-longest serving member of the First Parliament, and Charles Jones, a minister in the Whitlam Government. The current Member, since the 2013 federal election, is Sharon Claydon.

Members

Election results

References

External links
 Division of Newcastle - Australian Electoral Commission

Electoral divisions of Australia
Constituencies established in 1901
1901 establishments in Australia
Port Stephens Council